Sulfonmethane (sulfonomethane, sulfonal, acetone diethyl sulfone) is a chemical compound first synthesized by Eugen Baumann in 1888 and introduced as a hypnotic drug by Alfred Kast later on, but now superseded by newer and safer sedatives. Its appearance is either in colorless crystalline or powdered form. In United States, it is scheduled as a Schedule III drug in the Controlled Substance Act.

Effects 

It produces lengthened sleep in functional nervous insomnia, and is also useful in insanity, being given with mucilage of acacia or in hot liquids, owing to its insolubility, or in large capsules. Its hypnotic power is not equal to that of chloral, but as it is not a depressant to the heart or respiration it can be used when morphine or chloral are contra-indicated. It is, however, very uncertain in its action, often failing to produce sleep when taken at bedtime, but producing drowsiness and sleep the following day. The drowsiness the next day following a medicinal dose can be avoided by a saline laxative the morning after its administration. It is unwise to use it continuously for more than a few days at a time, as it tends to produce the sulfonal habit, which is attended by marked toxic effects, disturbances of digestion, giddiness, staggering gait and even paralysis of the lower extremities. These effects are accompanied by skin eruptions, and the urine becomes of a dark red color (hematoporphinuria). Sulfonal is cumulative in its effects. Many fatal cases of sulfonal poisoning are on record, both from chronic poisoning and from a single large dose.

Chemistry 

Sulfonal is prepared by condensing acetone with ethyl mercaptan in the presence of hydrochloric acid, the mercaptol (CH3)2C(SC2H5)2 formed being subsequently oxidized by potassium permanganate. It is also formed by the action of alcoholic potash and methyl iodide on ethylidene diethyl sulfine, CH3CH(SO2C2H5)2 (which is formed by the oxidation of dithioacetal with potassium permanganate). It crystallizes in prisms melting at 125 C, which are practically insoluble in cold water, but dissolve in 15 parts of hot and also in alcohol and ether.

See also 
 Trional
 Tetronal

References

Further reading 

 
 
 

Hypnotics
Sulfones
GABAA receptor positive allosteric modulators